Alper Önal (born 6 June 1996) is a Turkish footballer who plays as a forward for Adıyamanspor on loan from Ankaragücü.

Professional career
Önal made his professional debut with Ankaragücü in a 2-0 Süper Lig loss to Çaykur Rizespor on 25 October 2019.

References

External links
 
 

Living people
1996 births
Sportspeople from Manisa
Turkish footballers
Association football forwards
Manisa FK footballers
Manisaspor footballers
MKE Ankaragücü footballers
Fethiyespor footballers
Adıyamanspor footballers
Süper Lig players
TFF First League players
TFF Second League players